Ed Kerns (born February 22, 1945) is an American abstract artist and educator. Kerns studied with the noted Abstract-Expressionist painter, Grace Hartigan and through the elder artist came to know and work with many artists of that generation including, Phillip Guston, Willem de Kooning, James Brooks, Ernest Briggs, Richard Diebenkorn and Sam Francis.

Early life

Born in 1945 in Richmond, Virginia, Kerns started painting at a young age. He attended the Richmond Professional Institute, receiving his BFA in 1967.  He went on to the Maryland Institute, where he studied with painter Grace Hartigan. Here, Kerns received the Hoffberger Fellowship and graduated with an MFA in 1969.

Painting career
Kerns first gained exposure in 1972, when he was commissioned by art collector Larry Aldrich to paint 100 paintings over the course of the year as gifts. That same year, Kerns had his first solo art show at the AM Sachs Gallery in New York. Over the course of the 1970s and 80s, Kerns formed a close partnership with the Rosa Esman Gallery and exhibited ten solo shows there.

Of his work in the late 1970s and early 80s, gallery coordinator Judith Stein says, “He works slowly, creating no more than ten large paintings a year. His media are acrylic, sand, and thread, the last used to stitch together sections of canvas. Often plywood or Upson board is used as support.”

Teaching
Kerns began teaching in 1970, as an art teacher at the Bentley School in New York City. In 1972, he became head of the Art Department at the Baldwin School, and 1974, he headed the Art Department of Friends Seminary. In 1980, he left Friends Academy and moved to Easton, Pennsylvania, where he became the Head of Lafayette College’s Art Department. In 1988, he was selected to serve as the first Eugene H. Clapp II Professor of the Humanities at Lafayette College.

Collaborations
In 1989, Kerns collaborated with poet Lee Upton on a series of paintings. The series culminated in a show, A Collaboration of Poetry and Images, which was exhibited throughout Pennsylvania. Kerns has also collaborated with Rev. Ted Loder, illustrating four books written by the reverend.

In 2007, Kerns collaborated with artist Elizabeth Chapman on “Word, City, Mind: A Universal Resonance,” an exhibit that used "paint, text, collage, and image, the exhibit focuses on the resonance between neurological, cosmic, and man-made forms".

Exhibitions
Solo exhibitions
2008 "Word, City, Mind: A Universal Resonance," Skillman Library, Lafayette College, Easton, Pennsylvania
2007 "Word, City, Mind: A Universal Resonance," Muhlenberg College, Allentown, Pennsylvania
2005 "Ed Kerns, New Paintings," Banana Factory, Bethlehem, Pennsylvania
2003 "Ed Kerns, Digital Images," Ahlum Gallery, Easton, Pennsylvania
1997 "Ed Kerns, New Paintings," M-13 Gallery, New York, New York
1995 "Ed Kerns, Small Works: Project Room," M-13 Gallery, New York, New York
1994 "Ed Kerns, New Paintings," M-13 Gallery, New York, New York
1989 "Ed Kerns," William Paterson College, Ben Shahn Galleries, Wayne, New Jersey
1987 "Ed Kerns," Rosa Esman Gallery, New York, New York
1986 "Ed Kerns," Cedar Crest College, Allentown, Pennsylvania
1984 "Ed Kerns, Drawings," Painted Bride Art Center, Philadelphia, Pennsylvania
1983 "Ed Kerns, Paintings," Rosa Esman Gallery, New York, New York
1982 "Ed Kerns, Recent Paintings," Morris Gallery, The Pennsylvania Academy of the Fine Arts, Philadelphia, Pennsylvania
1981 "Ed Kerns, Recent Paintings," Rosa Esman Gallery, New York, New York
1980 "Ed Kerns, Paintings," Rosa Esman Gallery, New York, New York
"Ed Kerns, Paintings," VanWickle Gallery, Lafayette College, Easton, Pennsylvania
1979 "Ed Kerns," Rosa Esman Gallery, New York, New York
1978 "Ed Kerns, New Paintings," Rosa Esman Gallery, New York, New York
1977 "Ed Kerns, Paintings," Rosa Esman Gallery, New York, New York
"Ed Kerns, New York," Suzette Schochet Gallery, Newport, Rhode Island
1976 "Ed Kerns, Paintings," Rosa Esman Gallery, New York, New York
1975 "Ed Kerns," Rosa Esman Gallery, New York, New York
1974 "Ed Kerns, Paintings," Rosa Esman gallery, New York, New York
"Ed Kerns," A.M. Sachs Gallery, New York, New York
1972 "Ed Kerns," A.M. Sachs Gallery, New York, New York

Collaborations
2003 "Evolution"- Ed Kerns and Tom DiGiovanni, Main Stage Theatre of Williams Performing Arts Center, Lafayette College, Easton, Pennsylvania
1991 “A Collaboration of Poetry and Images,” Ed Kerns and Lee Upton, University Science Center, Philadelphia, Pennsylvania
1990 “A Collaboration of Poetry and Images,” Ed Kerns and Lee Upton, Villanova University, Villanova, Pennsylvania
“A Collaboration of Poetry and Images,” Ed Kerns and Lee Upton, Lafayette College Art Gallery, Easton, Pennsylvania; Open Space Art Gallery, Allentown, Pennsylvania

Selected group exhibitions
2007 "Hot Topic: Meditations on Global Warming," The Arts Center Gallery at Germantown Academy, Fort Washington, Pennsylvania
"Neuroscience and the Artistic Process," Muhlenberg College Center for the Arts, Allentown, Pennsylvania
2006 "Hypertexturalities:Architectures and Morphologies," Florence Lynch Gallery, New York, New York curated by Lee Klein
"The Mind of Nature: Structures and Processes," Taipei Culture Foundation, Taipei, Taiwan
"Ed Kerns, Lew Minter, Jim Toia Visiting American Artists," Taipei Artists Village, Taipei, Taiwan
2004 "Synthesis: Experiments in Collaboration" Axel Raben Gallery, New York, New York
2003 "Synthesis: Experiments in Collaboration," Lafayette College, Williams Visual Arts Building, Grossman Gallery, Easton, Pennsylvania
"Thinking in Line: A Survey of Contemporary Drawing," University Gallery, University of Florida, Gainesville, Florida
"Hyper Texture: Fabian Marcaccio, David Reed, Pia Fries, Ed Kerns, and Roy Lerner," The Florence Lynch Gallery, New York, New York curated by Lee Klein
"Michael Goldberg, Grace Hartigan, Mary Frank, and Ed Kerns," Seraphin Gallery, Philadelphia, Pennsylvania
2002 "Gallery Group Exhibit: Ed Kerns, Phoebe Adams, Grace Hartigan, Leon Golub, and George Herms," Seraphin Gallery, Philadelphia, Pennsylvania
"Post-Systemic Art," Hunterdon Museum of Art, Clinton, New Jersey
2001 “Lafayette College Faculty Exhibit,” Easton, Pennsylvania
2000 “Howard Scott Gallery, Artist” New York, New York
1999 “Howard Scott Gallery”, New York, New York
1998 “Faculty Plus,” State Theatre Gallery, Easton, Pennsylvania
Ruffino de Tamayo Print Museum, Mexico
1997 “Gallery Artists,” M-13 Gallery, New York, New York
1996 “White,” An exhibition of white paintings, M-13 Gallery, New York, New York
1993 “Collaboration, Kerns, Kessler, Greenberg, Boothe and Hassay,” Lafayette College, Easton, Pennsylvania
1992 “Ed Kerns, Small Works,” Open Space Gallery, Allentown, Pennsylvania
“Friends Seminary Benefit,” with Stella, Sultan, and others, New York, New York
1991 New Arts Program Group Exhibit, Kutztown University, Kutztown, Pennsylvania
“Mayfair,” Muhlenberg College, Center for the Arts, Allentown, Pennsylvania
1989 “Summer Exhibit,” Villanova University Art Gallery, Villanova University, Villanova, Pennsylvania
1988 “Summer Group,” Rosa Esman Gallery, New York, New York
1987 “Art Against Aids Exhibition,” Rosa Esman Gallery, New York, New York
Group Exhibition, Lehigh University, Wilson Gallery, Bethlehem, Pennsylvania
1986 Group Exhibition, Rosa Esman Gallery, New York, New York
1985 “July Group Exhibition,” Rosa Esman Gallery, New York, New York
“Fall Exhibition,” Rosa Esman Gallery, New York, New York
“Summer Exhibition,” Rosa Esman Gallery, New York, New York
1984 “Gallery Group,” Rosa Esman Gallery, New York, New York
“Faculty Exhibition,” Lafayette College, Easton, Pennsylvania
“New Abstract Painting,” Joint Exhibition, Lafayette and Muhlenberg Colleges, Easton and Allentown, Pennsylvania
“Group Exhibition,” Karl Sterner Gallery, Easton, Pennsylvania
1983 “Gallery Artists,” Rosa Esman Gallery, New York, New York
“Visiting Artists Exhibition,” Maryland Institute, College of Art, Baltimore, Maryland
1982 “Contemporary American Art,” The Commodities Corporation, Princeton, New Jersey
“Tenth Anniversary Exhibition of Gallery Artists, The Russian Revolution to Post Modern,” Rosa Esman Gallery, New York, New York
“Pennsylvania Artists,” Freedman Gallery, Albright College, Reading, Pennsylvania
“Chicago, Art Expo,” Rosa Esman Pavilion, Chicago, Illinois
“American Abstract Painting of the 80’s,” Randolph Macon College, Lynchburg, Virginia
1981 “Visiting New York Artists,” Maryland Institute, College of Art, Baltimore, Maryland
“Gallery Artists,” Rosa Esman Gallery, New York, New York
“Art in Pursuit of a Smile,” Center for the Arts, Muhlenberg College, Allentown, Pennsylvania
“Artists Make Architecture,” Rosa Esman Gallery, New York, New York
1980 “American Painting,” Mueso Civico e Gallerie D’arte Moderna, Udine, Italy
“Gallery Artists,” Rosa Esman Gallery, New York, New York
1979 “Structure and Painting,” Rosa Esman Gallery, New York, New York
“Summer Summary,” Rosa Esman Gallery, New York, New York
“Collage,” Goddard Riverside Gallery, New York, New York
1978 “Graffiti,” San Francisco Museum of Contemporary Art, San Francisco, California
1977 “Small Master Works,” Rosa Esman Gallery, New York, New York
“Skin,” Dayton Art Institute, Dayton, Ohio
“American Artists,” Basel Art Fair, Basel, Switzerland
“Art of the 60’s and 70’s,” Center for the Arts, Muhlenberg College, Allentown, Pennsylvania
“Summer Show,” Rosa Esman Gallery, New York, New York
1976 “The Material Dominant,” Penn State University Museum of Art, University Park, Pennsylvania
“American Artists,” F.A.I.C., Grand Palis, Paris, France
“Large Works,” Rosa Esman Gallery, New York, New York
“Project Rebuild,” Grey Art Gallery, New York University, New York, New York
“Contemporary American Painting,” Lehigh University, Bethlehem, Pennsylvania
“Works on Paper,” Image Gallery, Stockbridge, Massachusetts
“Gallery Group,” Rosa Esman Gallery, New York, New York
“Group Show,” Albright Knox Museum, Buffalo, New York
“Small Master Works,” Rosa Esman Gallery, New York, New York
“Art on Paper,” Weatherspoon Gallery, Raleigh, North Carolina
1975 “New York Artists,” Etienne De Causans, Tableaux Contemporains, Paris, France
“Gallery Artists,” Rosa Esman Gallery, New York, New York
1974 “Group Show,” Brooklyn Museum, Brooklyn, New York
1973 “Image of Movement,” Stamford Museum, Stamford, Connecticut
“Gallery Group,” A.M. Sachs Gallery, New York, New York
“Reflection,” Larry Aldrich Museum, Ridgefield, Connecticut
1972 “New York Artists,” Jacobs Ladder Gallery, Washington, D.C.
“Works on Paper,” Herter Hall Art Gallery, University of Massachusetts, Amherst, Massachusetts
1971 Larry Aldrich Associates, New York, New York
“Today,” Maryland Institute, College of Art, Baltimore, Maryland
“New Talent,” A.M. Sachs Gallery, New York, New York
“The Baltimore Museum of Art, New Talent,” Baltimore Museum of Art, Baltimore, Maryland

References

1945 births
Living people
Lafayette College faculty
American contemporary painters
American painters